Charles Fredericks (born Fred Cockerham; or Crockenham; September 5, 1918 – May 14, 1970) was an American actor of stage, television, and film.

Early years
Fredericks was born Fred Cockerham (or Crockenham) the son of a Presbyterian minister M. O. Cockerham and his wife. He had two brothers. He sang in the choir at the church at which his father preached. Although his father wanted him to become a minister, Fredericks wanted to be a singer. Success in competitions moved him further in that direction, as he won one contest that designated him the best male singer in Mississippi and another that earned him a singing scholarship.

Career
Fredericks was particularly known for his career in television Westerns during the 1950s and 1960s.

Singing
Fredericks debuted as a professional singer at the Brown Palace Hotel in Denver. After two weeks when the orchestra leader paid him $5 per week out of his own pocket, the hotel manager raised his salary to $20 per week. He went from that job to performing in vaudeville at $75 per week — an unsuccessful venture that led him back to Denver. With no employment as a singer available, he worked as a bellhop.

Stage and film
John Charles Thomas heard Fredericks singing in a night club and "was instrumental" in helping Fredericks to obtain the role of the governor when The Red Mill was presented by the Los Angeles Civic Light Opera.

Fredericks gained early acting experience on the "Bortsch circuit" in the Catskill Mountains. During the summer, his troupe performed a musical comedy, a revue, and a straight drama at each hotel.

Fredericks received the George Jean Nathan Award for his performance when he starred as Gaylord Ravenal in the 1946 Broadway revival of Show Boat, and was selected for the same role in the film of that title. He also appeared as Captain Nicholas Gregorovitch in the original 1947 production of Music in My Heart. In 1948, he portrayed a minister in My Romance at the Shubert Theatre in Boston and had the lead role in Music in the Air at the Greek Theater in Los Angeles. In 1953, he portrayed Sky Masterson in a touring company of Guys and Dolls.

Fredericks portrayed the singing King in the "Just You Wait" sequence of the film My Fair Lady (1964).

Radio and television
On July 13, 1947, Fredericks sang on the Family Hour radio program.

Among Fredericks's work on television, on Colt .45, he appeared as "Larkin" in the episode "Small Man" (1957) and as Marshal Ed Springer in  "The Gandy Dancers".(1960). He portrayed Sheriff Ankers on Bat Masterson in S3E10s "Last Stop To Austin". He also appeared as villains in the Maverick episodes "Trail West to Fury" and "The Maverick Line". He appeared in The Tab Hunter Show episode "For Money or Love" (1960). He also appeared on Gunsmoke as “Band” (1959), as “Senator McGovern” (1962), in S8E15's "False Front" and earlier that year as a convicted soldier in S7E33’s “The Prisoner”.

Personal life 
Fredericks was married to singer Muriel Parker, and they had two sons.

Partial filmography

Thunder Pass (1954) - McCurdy
Port of Hell (1954)
Treasure of Ruby Hills (1955) - Walt Payne
Tarzan's Hidden Jungle (1955) - DeGroot
Las Vegas Shakedown (1955) - Sheriff Charlie Woods
Night Freight (1955) - Workman
Hell Canyon Outlaws (1957) - Deputy Bear
I Want to Live! (1958) - Sucker at Card Game (uncredited)
Ice Palace (1960) - Bit Role (uncredited)
A Fever in the Blood (1961) - Callahan Party Worker (uncredited)
Tender Is the Night (1962) - Mr. Albert Charles McKisco
Lad, A Dog (1962) - Sheriff
The Cabinet of Caligari (1962) - Bob
Hemingway's Adventures of a Young Man (1962) - Mayor
Black Gold (1962) - Oil Man (uncredited)
To Kill a Mockingbird (1962) - Court Clerk (uncredited)
Dead Ringer (1964) - Tom Marshall (uncredited)
A House Is Not a Home (1964) - Bert
Kisses for My President (1964) - Blonde's Escort (uncredited)
My Fair Lady (1964) - King George V in Fantasy Sequence (uncredited)
The Great Race (1965) - Master of Ceremonies (uncredited)

References

External links

1918 births
1970 deaths
American male film actors
American male musical theatre actors
American male television actors
Male actors from Mississippi
People from Columbus, Mississippi
Male actors from Los Angeles
People from Sherman Oaks, Los Angeles
20th-century American male actors
20th-century American singers
20th-century American male singers